Craig Andrew Moore (born 12 December 1975) is an Australian former professional footballer who played as a centre-back. His 2006 FIFA World Cup profile describes him as being "tough-tackling and uncompromising but also calm and composed under pressure."

Moore, born and raised in the western Sydney suburb of Doonside, where he attended Crawford Public School and Doonside High while playing for the Doonside Hawks Soccer Club, is best known for his two spells with Scottish Premier Division / Scottish Premier League club Rangers. Having graduated through their youth system, he made 252 appearances for the Glasgow based club from 1993 to 2005, punctuated with a season in England with Crystal Palace in the 1998–99 First Division. In his time at Rangers he became team captain and won numerous domestic league and cup honours, including making 44 appearances and scoring four goals in their 2002–03 Treble-winning season.

After leaving Rangers on a free transfer in January 2005, Moore spent a half-season at German Bundesliga club Borussia Mönchengladbach, before moving to English Premier League club Newcastle United. Released by Newcastle after an injury hit two seasons, Moore returned to Australia signing with Queensland Roar (later renamed Brisbane Roar) in the Australian A-League, as their captain and Marquee player. After three seasons with the Roar, in January 2010 Moore moved to Greek Super League side AO Kavala, only to leave in March.

In international football, Moore has made over 50 appearances for the Australia national team, including at the 2006 and 2010 World Cups in Germany and South Africa. Having made his debut in 1995, he has been Australia national team captain a number of times.

Club career

Rangers

Moore was born in Canterbury, New South Wales and raised in Doonside, New South Wales. He played junior football with Brisbane club North Star after his family relocated north when he was thirteen, before a scholarship with the Australian Institute of Sport. Moore joined Rangers youth system and became an important player at the centre of Rangers defence up until 2004 over two spells.

Moore spent most of the 1998–99 season at Crystal Palace; despite being regarded as a success in London as the club fought relegation, he returned to Rangers after the South London club defaulted on transfer payments.

Moore was the captain of the "Olyroos", the Australian Olympic Football Team at the 2004 Olympics at Athens, Greece, when they managed to reach the quarter-finals. However, his involvement angered Rangers manager Alex McLeish as it forced him to miss the start of the Scottish league season. As a result, Moore was stripped of the club captaincy and was forced to the fringes of the team.

Moore won twelve major honours with Rangers including five league championships and a domestic treble in 2003.

Borussia Mönchengladbach
Moore was given a free transfer and joined Borussia Mönchengladbach on 3 January 2005, where he teamed up with former Rangers manager Dick Advocaat. When Advocaat was sacked after a short time in charge, Moore left the German club after falling out with the club management.

Newcastle United
On 30 July 2005, he signed a two-year deal at Newcastle United to play for the first time in the Premier League.

Moore made his competitive Newcastle United debut on 22 March 2006 against Chelsea in the FA Cup quarter-final, becoming the second Australian to play for the Magpies after Dave Mitchell who had a loan spell at St James' Park in the 1990–91 season. Moore's actual first game came at home to Yeading in which he scored one of five goals. Injuries ruined Moore's Newcastle career, and he only made eight premiership appearances in the 2005–06 season.

Moore was then injured in November 2006 and was ruled out for several months. He returned but struggled to get back into the team, with Peter Ramage, Steven Taylor, and Titus Bramble keeping him out. After Titus Bramble's dip in form, Moore returned to the first team. Moore made 17 premiership appearances in the 2006–07 season.

On 16 May 2007, it was announced that Moore's contract would not be renewed, and he was released by the club. He made 31 appearances for Newcastle.

Brisbane Roar
It was rumoured on 25 July 2007 that Moore had signed with Queensland Roar (now Brisbane Roar), to become the Roar's Marquee signing for the 2007–08 Hyundai A-League Season and the 2008–2009 season. This was confirmed with an announcement by Queensland and Moore on 25 July 2007 with Moore signing to be Queensland's marquee player for two years.

Moore's career with the Roar did not start well. He was sent off in the 69th minute in the first game of the season against Adelaide United for a second yellow card. Although Queensland were trailing 2–1 at the time, they came back to level the score at 2–2 and hold on for a draw. He scored his first goal for the Roar in their 2008–09 season round four clash with Perth Glory. Queensland went on to win 3–0.

In December 2008, Craig was fined for lodging bets totalling $600 on two matches involving A-League teams with betting exchange Betfair. These matches did not include his own side, and because of this, it was deemed a fine was a satisfactory punishment, with the Roar labelling it as an 'honest mistake'.

Moore left the Roar in December 2009, after falling out with the coach Ange Postecoglou and wanting a move to Europe to increase his chances of 2010 World Cup selection. Following his release, a European club was keen to sign Moore, which turns out to be Scottish Premier League side St Johnstone, where he could rejoin his former teammate Derek McInnes.

Kavala
In January 2010, he moved to Greek side AO Kavala on an eighteen-month contract. He debuted for Kavala on 10 January 2010 in a 1–0 loss against Asteras Tripolis.

It was reported on 31 March 2010 that his contract with Kavala had been terminated after an off-field incident. Moore later denied there had been an off-field incident, stating he had left over fears that he could experience burnout or serious injury, endangering his 2010 World Cup place, had he stayed at the Greek side, having played 15 games in all, 13 of those in just five weeks, on top of his games at the Roar earlier in the season.

Brisbane Strikers 
Moore signed for Queensland State League club Brisbane Strikers to maintain match fitness ahead of the 2010 World Cup, but Football Federation Australia requested his attendance in Socceroos camp just before he was set to make his Strikers debut.

Sydney United
Moore put on the red jersey of Sydney United in a farewell testimonial for former Socceroos and AC Milan goalkeeper Zeljko Kalac in July 2010 against Newcastle Jets.

International career
Moore represented the Socceroos in the 2006 FIFA World Cup. He scored a penalty kick against Croatia in the 39th minute of the game, enabling Australia to progress to the second round.

Moore announced his international retirement on 6 February 2008 after Australia's 3–0 win over Qatar in their first FIFA World Cup Qualifier at Telstra Dome. In september that year, Craig put his hand up for International call ups. On 1 October 2008, Australian coach Pim Verbeek announced that Moore was part of the 35-man squad for the upcoming World Cup Qualifiers.

Moore retired from international football after the 2010 World Cup.

Personal life
In November 2008, Moore was diagnosed with, and underwent surgery for, testicular cancer. Six weeks later, he was given the all-clear to resume his playing career.

Career statistics

Club

International

Scores and results list Australia's goal tally first, score column indicates score after each Moore goal.

Honours
Rangers
 Scottish Professional Football League: 1994–95, 1995–96, 1996–97, 1998–99, 1999–2000, 2002–03
 Scottish Cup: 1995–96, 1999–2000, 2001–02, 2002–03
 Scottish League Cup: 1996–97, 2001–02, 2002–03

Newcastle United
 UEFA Intertoto Cup: 2006

Australia 
 Queensland Roar Gary Wilkins Medal: 2007–08, 2008–09
 Football Federation Australia Hall of Fame: 2011

References

External links
 Craig Moore at Aussie Footballers
 

Living people
1975 births
Soccer players from Sydney
Association football defenders
Australia international soccer players
Olympic soccer players of Australia
Footballers at the 2004 Summer Olympics
Australian people of Irish descent
2001 FIFA Confederations Cup players
2005 FIFA Confederations Cup players
2006 FIFA World Cup players
2010 FIFA World Cup players
Rangers F.C. players
Crystal Palace F.C. players
Borussia Mönchengladbach players
Newcastle United F.C. players
Brisbane Roar FC players
Scottish Premier League players
Premier League players
Expatriate footballers in England
Expatriate footballers in Scotland
Expatriate footballers in Germany
Expatriate footballers in Greece
A-League Men players
Bundesliga players
Australian expatriate soccer players
Scottish Football League players
Australian Institute of Sport soccer players
Australian expatriate sportspeople in England
Australian expatriate sportspeople in Germany
Australian expatriate sportspeople in Greece
Australian expatriate sportspeople in Scotland
Marquee players (A-League Men)
Australian soccer players
Brisbane Strikers FC players